The  was a Japanese resistance organization that operated in communist China during the Second Sino-Japanese War, and World War II.

In 1944, the Japanese People's Emancipation League was established in Yan'an at the suggestion of Sanzo Nosaka. The People's Emancipation League is composed of Japanese who have voluntarily surrendered to the Chinese Communists and of anti-fascist refugees. Mao Zedong, Zhu De, Nosaka (under the name Susumu Okano), and other CCP leaders participated in the inaugural assembly of the Emancipation League. Zhu De called the foundation of the Emancipation League the starting point of a new Chinese-Japanese relationship, predicting that when the Emancipation League's struggle resulted in the establishment of a "people's government" in Japan, China and Japan would then become "genuinely cordial and reciprocal friends". 
The Japanese People's Emancipation League has absorbed the less effectual Japanese Anti-War league in numerous places. The Japanese Peoples Emancipation League has a unit in Shangtung Province.

Japanese prisoners are given a choice of remaining in the border region or returning to their lines. If they remain they are invited to the join the Emancipation League. Those who chose to return to their own lines were given farewell parties and were provided with traveling expenses and guides. Of the 3000-odd deserters or prisoners taken by the Chinese Communists from the outset of the war until the middle of 1944, only about 325 had decided to remain with the Eight Route Army. The Emancipation League had a three-point program: "opposition to the war, the overthrow of the militarists, and the establishment of a democratic, people's government in postwar Japan". The Emancipation League was designed primarily to influence the character of Japan's postwar development. The Emancipation League was open to communists, non-communists, and anti-communists. What was required for membership was "agreement with the basic program advocating the end of the war, the overthrow of the militarists and the establishment of a democratic Japan with improved conditions for peasants, industrial laborers and small business men". They didn't call them prisoners after they joined the Emancipation League. On July 12, 1944, it was reported that some league members are already serving in uniform with the Eighth Route Army as psychological warfare staff and instructors in Japanese methods of war.

The Emancipation League does not aspire to become the future Government, but merely aims to be the organ of those Japanese who oppose the ambitions of the military caste. Slogans of the league do not demand the downfall of the Emperor and do not attack the Mitsui and Mitsubishi trusts, but call for immediate cessation of the war and withdrawal of Japanese troops from all occupied territories including Manchukuo, and the establishment of democratic government. Regarding the Allied occupation of Japan, the league hopes that the Japanese people will make it unnecessary by destroying militarism first, but favors it if the people fail to do the job unaided.

The Japanese People's Emancipation League had a growing influence among the Japanese armies and residents in occupied China, and in anti-militarist groups in Japan. According to Okano, "The league's policy is to divide Japan's ruling classes by concentrating all propaganda against the militarists, instead of uniting the rulers by premature agitation against the Emperor, who can easily be dealt with when the militarists are defeated from within and without. Beyond that the only aim of the League and the Japanese Communist Party is democracy, since Japan is not ripe for a Communists' revolution. The intent force of our party is still great, in spite of suppression."

John K. Emmerson stated that the Emancipation League's declared principles are democratic, and that it is not identified with the Communist Party. However, the Emancipation League would be characterized by the United States House Committee on Foreign Affairs as a Communist organization.

A Life magazine article on December 18, 1944, titled "Inside Red China From remote, inaccessible Yenan comes an account of Communist resistance against merciless Japanese by Teddy White" reported that the Japanese People's Emancipation League had numbered more than 300 active members. John K. Emmerson reported on November 7, 1944 that the Emancipation League had an estimated membership of 450 Japanese prisoners in north and central China.

The Japanese army allegedly sent half a dozen assassins into the Yenan area to poison Okano and disrupt the activities of the Emancipation League. Six JPEL members were accused of being commissioned by the Japanese secret service to "surrender" to the Eight Route Army in order to destroy the Emancipation League from within.

The Japanese People's Emancipation League has over 20 branches all over the Chinese Liberated Areas.

The league possessed its own banner.


See also 
Members
Shigeo Tsutsui
Sanzo Nosaka
Similar organizations
Japanese People's Anti-war Alliance
League to Raise the Political Consciousness of Japanese Troops
Related phenomena
Japanese dissidence during the Shōwa period
Japanese in the Chinese resistance to the Empire of Japan

References

Further reading

Japanese American Committee for Democracy. Japanese People's Emancipation League: Its Program and Activities: A Japanese People's Movement for a Democratic Japan. 1945.

External links

World War II resistance movements
Japanese Resistance
Organizations established in 1944